Kathrin Ress (born June 26, 1985) is an Italian professional basketball player, formerly of the WNBA, with the Minnesota Lynx.

College career
Born in Salorno, South Tyrol, Ress attended college at Boston College and graduated in 2007.  In her senior season at BC she averaged 16.4 ppg and 8.2 rpg.  One of Ress' best performances came in front of her parents against Maryland where she put up 26 points against one of the best defenses in the country. .

Professional career
Following her collegiate career, she was selected 24th overall in the 2007 WNBA Draft by the Minnesota Lynx. Ress played in 28 games for the Lynx in 2007, averaging 3.0 points and 2.5 rebounds per game before leaving the team to train with the Italian National Team on August 7.

WNBA career statistics

Regular season

|-
| align="left" | 2007
| align="left" | Minnesota
| 28 || 1 || 12.4 || .397 || .500 || .724 || 2.5 || 0.6 || 0.3 || 0.1 || 1.3 || 3.0
|-
| align="left" | Career
| align="left" | 1 year, 1 team
| 28 || 1 || 12.4 || .397 || .500 || .724 || 2.5 || 0.6 || 0.3 || 0.1 || 1.3 || 3.0

Personal
She is the sister of the professional basketball player Tomas Ress.

Boston College statistics
Source

References

External links
WNBA Player Profile
WNBA Prospect Profile
Boston College bio

1985 births
Living people
Boston College Eagles women's basketball players
Centers (basketball)
Italian expatriate basketball people in the United States
Italian women's basketball players
Minnesota Lynx draft picks
Minnesota Lynx players
People from Salurn
Power forwards (basketball)
Sportspeople from Südtirol